The 2017 Women's Four Nations Tournament (Torneio Quatro Nações) in Portuguese, was the 2nd edition of the Women's Four Nations Tournament held in São Bernardo do Campo, Brazil between 9–11 June as a Women's friendly handball tournament organised by the Brazilian Handball Confederation.

Results

Round robin
All times are local (UTC−03:00).

Final standing

References

External links
Tournament page on CBHb official web site

Women
Four Nations Tournament
2017 in Brazilian sport
Four
June 2017 sports events in South America
2017 in Brazilian women's sport